Binyamin A. Amirà (3 June 1896 – 20 January 1968) was an Israeli mathematician.

Biography
Born in 1896 in Mohilev, Russian Empire, Binyamin Amirà emigrated with his family to Tel Aviv in Ottoman Palestine in 1910, where he attended the Herzliya Gymnasium. Amirà went on to study mathematics at the University of Geneva, after which he moved to the University of Göttingen in 1921 to undertake research for his doctorate under the supervision of Edmund Landau.

After completing his D.Sc. in 1924, Amirà spent a brief period at the University of Geneva as Privatdozent, after which he followed Landau in 1925 to help him in establishing the Mathematics Institute of the newly-founded Hebrew University in Jerusalem. There he became the institute's first tenured staff member.

Amirà founded the Journal d'Analyse Mathématique in 1951, which he edited alongside Ze'ev Nehari and Menahem Schiffer. He retired in 1960.

References

1896 births
1968 deaths
Academic journal editors
Burials at Har HaMenuchot
Chevaliers of the Légion d'honneur
Academic staff of the Hebrew University of Jerusalem
Herzliya Hebrew Gymnasium alumni
Emigrants from the Russian Empire to the Ottoman Empire
Israeli mathematicians
Israeli Jews
Israeli people of Russian-Jewish descent
Mandatory Palestine expatriates in Germany
Mandatory Palestine expatriates in Switzerland
People from Mohyliv-Podilskyi
Ukrainian emigrants to Israel
University of Geneva alumni
University of Göttingen alumni
Institute for Advanced Study visiting scholars